Marquee Brands is a holding company founded in 2014 that owns several brands in fashion and home cooking. Marquee Brands is sponsored by employee-owned investment management firm Neuberger Berman.

Brands
Anti Social Social Club
BCBGMAXAZRIA
BCBGeneration
Ben Sherman
Body Glove
Bruno Magli
Dakine
Destination Maternity (Motherhood Maternity, A Pea In The Pod)
Emeril Lagasse
Martha Stewart
Sur la Table

References

External links

Companies established in 2014
Holding companies